Steam and water analysis system (SWAS) is a system dedicated to the analysis of steam or water. In power stations, it is usually used to analyze boiler steam and water to ensure the water used to generate electricity is clean from impurities which can cause corrosion to any metallic surface, such as in boiler and turbine.

Steam and water analysis system (SWAS)
Corrosion and erosion are major concerns in thermal power plants operating on steam. The steam reaching the turbines need to be ultra-pure and hence needs to be monitored for its quality. A well designed Steam and Water Analysis system (SWAS) can help in monitoring the critical parameters in the steam. These parameters include pH, conductivity, silica, sodium, dissolved oxygen, phosphate and chlorides. A well designed SWAS must ensure that the sample is representative until the point of analysis. To achieve this, it is important to take care of the following aspects of the sample:

 Sample Extraction
 Sample Transport
 Conditioning
 Analysis
 Controls

These aspects are well explained in international standards like ASME PTC 19.11-2008 and VGB S006 -00 2012_09_EN. The International Association for the Properties of Water and Steam (IAPWS) also gives good information on important measurement points and its significance.

Sample handling system components are the most important pressure parts of sample handling system and need to have certification from ASME Section VIII Div1 & Div2 or PED. Also many times country-specific certifications required like

 American: ASME Section VIII Div 1 and Div 2/ ASME U and S Stamp 
Europe: Pressure Equipment Directive (PED)
India: Indian Boiler Regulation (IBR) form IIIC
 Malaysia: DOSH
 Russia: CU TR Certification

Sample extraction 
To ensure that the sample that is going to be extracted for analysis represents the process conditions exactly, it is important to choose the correct sample extraction probe. The validity of the analysis is largely dependent on the sample being truly representative. As the probe is going to be directly attached to the process pipe work, it may have to withstand severe conditions. For most applications, the sample probe is manufactured to the stringent codes applicable to high-pressure, high-temperature pipework.

The selection of the right type of probe is a challenge. Its use depends on the process stream parameter to be measured, the required sample flow rate and the location of the sampling point (which is also called the 'tapping point'). An important aspect of the sample extraction probe design is that the steam must enter the probe at the same velocity as the steam flowing in the pipeline from where the sample (it can be steam or water) was extracted. These probes are designed as per ASTM D1066 standard for steam extraction and must be designed and tested for their structural integrity in High pressure, High Temperature and Higher velocity of samples.

Sample extraction probes are extremely important and necessary of proper analysis of suspended impurities like Corrosion products, Total Iron, copper, carryover effects.

Sample Transport 
Section#4 in ASME PTC 19.11-2008 standard describes details for designing of sample transportation lines. Following care need to take while designing of this sample transportation lines:

(1) Line Size Selection:

Following aspects are very important while designing of sample Transportation lines.

(a) Transportation time i.e. (Velocity) of sample from Isokinetic sample extraction probes to sampling system should be as minimum. SWAS room must be located close to low pressure water (condensate) samples from CEP discharge and condensate Polishing plants with lesser velocities.

(b) Pressure drops in lines is an important aspect. It is very important that the sample meets least resistance. Hence joints and bends in the pipeline need to be minimal. Also, sample lines must be continuously sloping to avoid accumulation of samples in lines.

(2) Line Material:

Minimum Stainless steel SS316 Grade material must be used for sample Transport Lines. This is to avoid corrosion of lines which leads to wrong measurement and analysis. For High pressure and Temperature samples (Super heated steam, Reheated Steam, Saturated Steam, Separator drains,  Feed water at Economizer inlets) SS316H must be used which withstand High Temperature of samples.

Sample conditioning system 
Sample conditioning system in some countries is also called sampling system, Wet Panel or Wet Rack. This is intended to house various components for sample conditioning. This may be an open rack or a closed enclosure with a corridor in between. The system contains sample conditioning equipment and a grab sampling sink. In this system stage, sample is first cooled in Sample Coolers, depressurized in Pressure Regulator and then fed to various analyzers while the flow characteristics is kept constant by means of Back Pressure Regulator.

The need to condition the sample exists, because the sensors used for online analysis are not able to handle the water/steam sample at high temperatures or pressures. To maintain a common reference of analysis, the sample analysis should be done at 25 °C. However, due to temperature compensation logic being available in most of the analyzers today, it is a practice to cool the sample to 25–40 °C. with the help of a well engineered sample conditioning system and then feed the conditioned sample to the analyzers.

However, if an uncompensated sample is to be analyzed, it becomes essential to cool the sample to 25 °C +/- 1 °C. This can be achieved by two-stage cooling. In the first stage cooling (also known as 'primary cooling'), the sample is cooled by using available cooling water. In most of the countries, cooling water is available in the range of 30–32 °C. This cooling water can cool the sample unto 35 °C(considering an approach temperature of 3 to 5 °C). A sample cooler is used to achieve this. Sample cooler is a heat exchanger specially designed for SWAS applications. Preferred sample cooler for primary cooling is a double helix coil in shell type design providing contraflow heat exchange.

The remaining part of cooling (i.e. from 35 to 25 °C) is achieved by using chilled water in the secondary cooling circuit. A chilled water supply is required from the plant or else an independent chiller package can be considered for this purpose along with SWAS.

The sampling system can be an 'open-frame free standing' type design or a fully or partially closed design, depending on the choice of the user, the environment it is supposed to operate in & the criticality of operation.

Sample coolers 

In the sampling system, sample coolers play a major role in bringing down the temperature of hot steam (or water) to a temperature acceptable to the sensors of the on-line analyser. Some of the important design aspects of sample coolers are:
 Preferably a sample cooler design should be double helix, coil in shell type, so designed as to provide contra-flow heat exchange. This makes the sample cooler more compact, yet highly effective in terms of heat exchange.
 Sample coils made of stainless steel SS-316 are suitable for normal cooling water conditions. However, if the chloride content in the cooling water is high (more than 35 ppm), then other suitable coil materials such as Monel or Inconel need to be used depending upon the quality of cooling water.
 A “built-in” safety relief valve on shell side of the cooler is a must, so as to prevent explosion of the shell in event of sample coil failure.
 The sample cooler design must be meeting ASME PTC 19.11 standard requirements.
These sample coolers handle very high pressure and Temperature steam and Water samples and thus it is very important to design these Helical Tube Heat Exchangers inline with Pressure vessel standards

These are unfired pressure vessels and thus designed inline with ASME Section VIII Div 1&2, Pressure Equipment Directives (PED) Standards. Also many countries asked for local certification like

 American: ASME Section VIII Div 1 and Div 2/ ASME U and S Stamp
Europe: Pressure Equipment Directive (PED)
India: Indian Boiler Regulation (IBR) form IIIC
 Malaysia: DOSH
 Russia: CU TR Certification

Pressure reducers 
After the sample is cooled, the pressure of the sample must be reduced to meet the requirement of the sensors that receive this sample. Usually, the sensors like pH, conductivity, silica, sodium, and hydrazine require low pressure sample for healthy operation.

A rod-in-tube type of pressure reducer is the most effective method of pressure reduction recommended in ASME PTC19.11-2008 standard.

As per the latest technology, a Sample rod-in-tube pressure reducer with thermal and safety relief valve device is considered to be the most reliable and safe device. Single Rod in Tube System  is a system in itself that takes care of some important aspects of sample conditioning. The pressure reducer in the Sampling system is rated for high very high pressure 450 Bar. There is no need of filters before the Rod in tube Pressure Reducers, as cleaning is on-line, without using any tools. For maintenance, no-shut-down is required for cleaning these pressure reducer.

Safety of analyzers against high temperature 
Analyzers must be protected from high temperature samples. This is to avoid situations in case of failure of cooling water to primary sample coolers. There are various methods for stopping sample to analyzer in such a situation. The most popular and simple method is use of mechanical thermal shut off valves. These valves close and block samples to analyzer in case of cooling water failures.

These valves must be with:

(1) High pressure rating and designed inline with ASME standards to assure safety of operator and instruments downstream.

(2) This valves must be with MANUAL RESET design as recommended in ASME PTC 19.11-2008 standards.

(3) These valves must be equipped with potential free alarm contact for operator indication in Control system.

Sample analysis system 
A sample analysis system in some countries is also called Analyser Panel, Dry Panel or Dry Rack. It is usually a free-standing enclosed panel. The system contains the transmitter electronics, usually it is mounted on panels. In this system stage, sample is analyzed on its pH, conductivity, silica, phosphate, chloride, dissolved oxygen, hydrazine, sodium etc.

Types of conductivity measurement 
Three types of conductivity measurement are usually done:
 Specific conductivity,
 Cation conductivity and
 De-gassed cation conductivity.

There is a difference between these three types of measurements.
 Specific conductivity gives overall conductivity value of the sample and is the most generic measurement
 Cation conductivity is conductivity measurement after the Cation Column. At the Cation Column, the H+ resins replace the positive ions of all dissolved matter in the solution. (e.g. NH4OH + H(+) gives NH4+ and ). The impurities are nothing but salts of different natures These get converted to respective acids (e.g. NaCl + H(+) gives HCl and Cl-). Thus masking effects of treatment chemicals on the conductivity value are eliminated, while the conversion of salts to corresponding acids has an effect of increase in their corresponding conductivity value to around three times its original value. Thus, in effect, cation conductivity acts as amplifier of conductivity due to impurities and eliminator of conductivity due to treatment chemicals.
 De-gassed conductivity is the finest level of conductivity measurement. Here one removes the masking effects of dissolved gases, mainly , on the conductivity measurement. In the De-Gassed conductivity system, there is a reboiler chamber to heat the sample, so that the dissolved gases are liberated and then there is cooling mechanism, by which the hot liquid is cooled again. The conductivity measured after this process is indeed the 'real' value of conductivity because of 'dissolved' impurities after eliminating the dissolved gases. Degas columns are designed inline with ASTM D4519 Standard. These measurements are also recommended in standards like ASME PTC 19.11-2008 and VGB S006 -00 2012_09_EN. You can also refer IAPWS guidelines for more information. 
These Three conductivity measurement are very important and also used to calculate pH and dissolved  values in steam and water cycles.

Silica problem 
When it comes to safety and efficiency of the steam turbine and boiler in a power plant, silica becomes one of the most critical factors to be monitored. Deposition of various impurities on turbine blades has been identified as one of the most common problems. Various compounds deposit on the turbine blades. Of all these compounds, silica (SiO2) deposits can occur at lower operating pressures also. Therefore, silica deposition is quite common in turbines than other types of deposits. Silica usually deposits in the intermediate-pressure and low-pressure sections of the turbine. These deposits are hard to remove, disturb the geometry of turbine blades and ultimately result in vibrations causing imbalance and loss of output from turbine.

Another important area of concern as far as silica deposition is concerned is boiler tube. Silica scale is one of the hardest scale to remove. Because of its low thermal conductivity, a very thin silica deposit can reduce heat transfer considerably, reducing efficiency, leading to hot spots and ultimately ruptures.

Because of all these issues, it is extremely important to closely monitor silica levels by using on-line silica analyzers that can measure silica levels to a ppb (parts per billion) level.

See also 
 Boiler (power generation)
 Supercritical steam generator

References

Steam power